Melissa Lee is a reporter, journalist, and news anchor for CNBC. Since January 2009, she has occasionally hosted Closing Bell when the anchor is unavailable. She has also hosted Options Action, and is now the host of CNBC's 5pm ET daily show Fast Money.

Lee took over as host of CNBC's 5pm ET daily show, Fast Money when Dylan Ratigan left CNBC for companion network MSNBC on March 27, 2009.  She was the interim host after Ratigan's departure, until April of the same year when she was appointed permanent host. Lee has received two Emmy Award nominations for Business News.

Lee has hosted six CNBC documentaries:
Made in China: The People's Republic of Profit
Coca-Cola: The Real Story Behind the Real Thing
Porn: Business of Pleasure
The $50M Con
Code Wars: America's Cyber Threat
Bitcoin: Boom or Bust

, Lee hosts 3 CNBC programs: Fast Money, Options Action, and Money in Motion: Currency Trading. Since February 9, 2015, Lee is one of four hosts for Power Lunch.

Early life, education, and career
Lee's grandfather immigrated from rural China to Buffalo, New York in the United States, along with his wife and children. Lee's father graduated from Columbia University and then moved to Great Neck, New York. Lee grew up idolizing New York news anchor Kaity Tong, who inspired Lee to become a reporter. Lee started her professional journalism career as a reporter for her hometown newspaper, the Great Neck Record. She graduated from Harvard College with a Bachelor of Arts in Government in 1995. She also served as Assistant Managing Editor of The Harvard Crimson. Prior to joining CNBC in 2004, Lee worked for Bloomberg Television and CNN Financial News.  Before her career in television, Lee was a consultant at Mercer Management Consulting. Her cases focused on the banking and credit card sectors.

Lee is married to Ben Kallo, a financial analyst, and gave birth to twins in 2019.

See also
 Chinese Americans in New York City
 New Yorkers in journalism

References

External links
 Melissa Lee's Profile on CNBC
 Coca Cola: The Story Behind the Real Thing
 Porn: Business of Pleasure
 Made in China: The People's Republic of Profit
 Asiance Interview with Melissa Lee
C-SPAN Q&A interview with Lee, April 10, 2011

Year of birth missing (living people)
Living people
Harvard College alumni
American management consultants
American journalists of Chinese descent
American reporters and correspondents
American television journalists
American business and financial journalists
News & Documentary Emmy Award winners
The Harvard Crimson people
People from Great Neck, New York
American women television journalists
CNBC people
Women business and financial journalists
American women journalists of Asian descent